New Montefiore Cemetery is a Jewish cemetery located in West Babylon, New York.

History
Montefiore Cemetery Corporation had been maintaining Montefiore Cemetery in Springfield Gardens, Queens since 1908. The corporation bought 250 acres from Pinelawn Cemetery for $375,000 and established New Montefiore Cemetery in 1928. Burials started shortly afterwards.

New Montefiore is one of a group of adjacent large cemeteries on Long Island sometimes called "cemetery row." From north to south along Wellwood Avenue, these are the Department of Veterans Affairs' Long Island National Cemetery, the non-sectarian Pinelawn Memorial Park and Gardens, the Roman Catholic Diocese of Brooklyn's Saint Charles Cemetery, and four Jewish cemeteries, which are Beth Moses Cemetery, Wellwood Cemetery, New Montefiore, and Mount Ararat Cemetery.

The Shomrim Society, the fraternal society of Jewish officers in the New York City Police Department, has a burial plot for their members in New Montefiore Cemetery.

Notable burials
 Herb Abrams (1955–1996) (born Herbert Charles Abrams), founder of the Universal Wrestling Federation
 Skippy Adelman (1924–2004) (born Julius Adelman), photographer, executive in film production and advertising agencies
 Abe Beame (1906–2001) (born Abraham David Birnbaum), mayor of New York City
 Benny Bell (1906–1999) (born Benjamin Samberg), American singer and songwriter
 Ruby Goldstein (1907–1984), boxer and boxing referee
Aaron Goodelman (1890-1978), sculptor
 Morton Gould (1913–1996), musical composer, conductor, arranger, and pianist
 Laurel Griggs (2006–2019), child actress
 Ze'ev Jabotinsky (1880–1940), Zionist leader, author, poet, orator, and soldier, reinterred in Mount Herzl Cemetery in Jerusalem in 1964.
 Alexa Kenin (1962–1985), actress
 Oscar Lewis (1914–1970), author and anthropologist
 Jacob Milch (1866–1945), writer, candy manufacturer, socialist
 Moissaye Joseph Olgin (1878–1939), writer, journalist, and Communist
 Mae Questel (1908–1998), actress and vocal artist
 Tommy Ramone (real name Thomas Erdely, 1949–2014), original drummer for the punk rock band, the Ramones.
 Emily Remler (1957-1990), jazz guitarist
 Seymour R. Thaler (1919–1976), lawyer, New York State Senator, and felon
 Nahum Tschacbasov (1899–1984), Russian Empire-born painter, educator, poet
 Lou Pearlman (1954-2016), record producer

See also

 List of cemeteries in New York

References

External links
 New Montefiore Cemetery Official Website
 

Jewish cemeteries in New York (state)
Cemeteries in Suffolk County, New York
Jews and Judaism in Suffolk County, New York
1928 establishments in New York (state)